Life Support is the debut studio album by American singer and songwriter Madison Beer, released by Access Records and Epic Records on February 26, 2021. Beer herself co-wrote the whole album, and co-produced most of the record, to the making of a concept album based and created in the midst of Beer's major depressive episode and diagnosis with borderline personality disorder. The album deals with themes of mental health, grief and heartbreak, as well as Beer's experiences with public scrutiny inside the music industry, and building resilience during the making of the record. Musically, Life Support is a pop and R&B record with elements of indie pop.

Life Support generated four singles: "Good in Goodbye", released as the album's lead single, "Selfish", "Baby" and "Boyshit", and three promotional singles: "Stained Glass", "Blue" and "Everything Happens for a Reason". The album debuted at number 65 on the US Billboard 200 and reached the top 40 in the United Kingdom, Canada, and other countries around the globe.

Background
On November 9, 2018, Beer released "Hurts Like Hell" as the lead single from her then untitled debut studio album. After the release of the single, Beer revealed that the album would be released sometime in 2019. "Hurts Like Hell" was later removed from the album's track listing and "Dear Society" replaced it as the album's lead single, being released on May 17, 2019. In August 2019, the album's title Life Support was leaked. Shortly after that, Beer announced that she had signed with Epic Records and that she planned to release new music soon. Beer wrote the album with the intent of truly expressing herself and having her own voice, "I feel like I'm finally being seen for things that I value and being viewed for things that I actually feel really good about. And my music I feel like is speaking for itself," adding "This is who I am." She also shared that she wanted to show those that mental health issues and internet perfection are not exclusive of one another, saying "'You have a perfect life.' And I'm like, no, I want to show you even if it looks like I do, I am also struggling severely and in therapy every single day and I'm on anxiety medication. I just wanted to deconstruct this idea that people have that if you present like you have a perfect life on social media, that doesn't mean that you actually do," signifying that she wanted to express that not everything you see means someone's life is perfect. Describing the album in three words, she chose "Honest, brave and badass". Her favorite lyrical track is "Effortlessly".

Music and lyrics
Life Support was described by reviewers as a dark, personal, and sad album influenced by R&B, indie pop, and pop. In an interview with Zach Sang and Dan Zolot, Beer confirmed that she was inspired by a variety of artists, including Tame Impala, Lana Del Rey and Twenty One Pilots. Lyrically, the album deals with mental health, self reflection, grief, and breaking one free of restraints.

"Good in Goodbye" is a catchy break-up anthem with a dark melody that according to Beer is about "cutting ties with a toxic person, no matter how tough it can feel at the time, is sometimes the only way forward."  "Default", a sentimental ballad, details Beer's struggles with anxiety and suicidal ideation. "Selfish" is a slow-tempo pop "breakup ballad" with stripped down production that emphasizes Beer's vocals. Lyrically, the song is about toxic relationships. "Stained Glass" is a downbeat ballad about public scrutiny and Beer's struggles with mental health. The song's production begins with just piano before adding drums on the song's chorus and Beer's vocal performance was described as "haunting and beautiful". "Sour Times" was inspired by Tame Impala, with lyrics detailing Beer's experiences with harassment and getting taken advantage due to a mentally vulnerable state. The country ballad "Homesick" samples a dialogue of the sci-fi animated sitcom Rick and Morty, which Madison states is her favorite cartoon. Primarily, the songs talks about social alienation and Beer's abandonment issues, by referencing her beliefs in outer space species. The album closes with "Everything Happens For A Reason", a country ballad with 50s-60s influences, in which the lyrics suggest that Beer will never heal from her pain, but remains looking for its reason.

The main writers of the album, Kinetics & One Love, who also worked with Beer on As She Pleases are also writers of fellow artist Melanie Martinez, whom Beer is inspired by and "loves", and is the reason she chose her writers specifically.

Singles
"Good in Goodbye" was released as the album's lead single on January 31, 2020. It reached number 15 on the New Zealand Hot Singles chart and impacted contemporary hit radio in Italy on April 3, 2020. The song received a music video that accompanied the song's release.

"Selfish" was released as the album's second single on February 14, 2020. It reached number 19 on the US Bubbling Under Hot 100 chart as well as entering official charts in Canada, Ireland and the UK. It impacted contemporary hit radio in the United States on May 19, 2020. The song also received a music video that was directed by Beer herself.

Promotional singles

"Stained Glass" was released on April 3, 2020, as the album's promotional single.

Tour
On May 17, 2021, Beer announced a 26-date North American tour, titled the Life Support Tour, which was followed on June 9 with a 23-date European leg of the tour. On July 30, she announced Maggie Lindemann and Audriix would be the opening acts for the North American leg. Leah Kate was announced as the European leg opener on March 15, 2022. The tour began on October 18, 2021 in Toronto at Queen Elizabeth Theatre and ended on November 28, 2021 in Los Angeles at The Wiltern, the European leg picked up on March 28, 2022 in Madrid at La Riviera and concluded on April 28, 2022 in Oslo at Vulkan Arena.
{{Infobox concert
| concert_tour_name = The Life Support Tour
| artist = Madison Beer
| image = https://scontent-lga3-2.cdninstagram.com/v/t51.2885-15/229225595_861125974793254_5133451896422910170_n.jpg?stp=dst-jpg_e35_p640x640_sh0.08&_nc_ht=scontent-lga3-2.cdninstagram.com&_nc_cat=110&_nc_ohc=Evuk1PnuKBEAX_QbqxA&edm=AABBvjUBAAAA&ccb=7-5&oh=00_AT-Y-
| image_size = 220px
| album = Life Support (Madison Beer album)
| start_date = 
| end_date = 
| number_of_legs = 2
| number_of_shows = 27 in North America26 in Europe53 Total
| last_tour = As She Pleases Tour(2018)
| this_tour = The Life Support Tour(2021–2022)
}}

 Setlist 
The following setlist was obtained from the October 18, 2021 concert, held at Queen Elizabeth Theatre in Toronto, Canada. It does not represent all concerts for the duration of the tour.

 The Beginning
 Baby (Extended)
 Good in Goodbye
 Stay Numb and Carry On
 Emotional Bruises
 Reckless
 Homesick
 Stained Glass
 Default
 Effortlessly
 Selfish
 Blue
 Sour Times
 Dear Society
 BOYSHIT
 Has Anyone Seen the White Rabbit?
 Follow the White Rabbit
 Everything Happens for a Reason
Notes

• During the show in Oslo, Channel Surfing / The End was performed.

 Shows 

Critical receptionLife Support was met with generally positive reviews from critics, many praising her vocal presence and the album's subject matter. According to Metacritic, which assigns a weighted average score out of 100 to ratings and reviews from mainstream critics, critics gave Life Support a score of 71, based on four reviews, indicating "generally favorable reviews".

Writing for Beats Per Minute, JT Early said: "Life Support is a lovingly-crafted project which explores mental health, heartbreak, toxicity and self-assertion. The album presents an array of lush pop and R&B tracks connected through decadent orchestration. The soundscapes here are cinematic and cohesive, while Beer's versatile vocals easily go from sultry to dreamily resonant to emphatically cold. Life Support is a victorious debut from a singer whose determination and passion has allowed her to overcome any naysayers and detractors." Hannah Mylrea of NME wrote: "On a lesser album, the eclecticism might lead to a lack of coherence, but this record is always threaded through with Beer's diaristic lyricism. With its consistent, gut-punching honesty and witty wordplay, you'll always find something special on Life Support." Marcy Donelson of AllMusic said: "The album's 17 tracks address subject matter including breakups, grief, and struggles with mental health with a mix of pop, R&B, and alternative stylings."

 Commercial performance Life Support entered the national charts in various territories. In the United States, it debuted at number 65 on the US Billboard 200 with 11,800 album equivalent units, according to Rolling Stone charts. In the United Kingdom, the album debuted at number 28, making it Beer's first top 40 on the country. Elsewhere, the album debuted at number 21 in Ireland, number 23 on Canada, and number 33 in New Zealand.

Track listing

Notes
 "Boyshit" is stylized in all caps.
 "Homesick" contains excerpts from the adult animated sitcom, Rick and Morty'', performed by Justin Roiland.
 "Channel Surfing / the End" samples Beer's 2019 single "Dear Society" as well as parts of a demo version of "Stained Glass".

Personnel
Credits adapted from Tidal.

 Madison Beer – vocals , backing vocals , songwriting , production , executive production 
 Leroy Clampitt – songwriting , production , executive production , bass , guitar , keyboards , programming , vocal production , drums , piano , synthesizer , strings , record engineering , electric guitar 
 Kinetics & One Love – songwriting 
 One Love – production , bass , drums , keyboards , programming , piano , vocal production , backing vocals 
 Elizabeth Lowell Bowland – songwriting , vocals , backing vocals , synthesizer 
 Isaiah Dominique Libeau – songwriting 
 Rachel Keen – songwriting , keyboards 
 Paul "Phamous" Shelton – songwriting , backing vocals 
 Jaramye Daniels – songwriting 
 Jake Banfield – songwriting 
 Pete Nappi – songwriting , production , bass , guitar , keyboards , programming 
 Upsahl – songwriting , backing vocals 
 1993 – production 
 E. Kidd Bogart – songwriting 
 Larus "Leo" Arnarson – songwriting , bass , drums , keyboards 
 Oscar Scivier – executive production 
 Smoke – miscellaneous production , programming 
 Bart Schoudel – vocal engineering , vocal production 
 Kinga Bacik – strings , cello 
 Chris Gehringer – mastering 
 Mitch McCarthy – mixing

Design
 Amber Park – creative direction, design
 Amber Asaly – photography
 Isabella Pettinato Santos – assistant

Charts

References

2021 debut albums
Epic Records albums
Madison Beer albums